Cresmatoneta is a genus of  dwarf spiders that was first described by Eugène Louis Simon in 1929.  it contains only three species: C. leucophthalma, C. mutinensis, and C. nipponensis.

See also
 List of Linyphiidae species

References

Araneomorphae genera
Linyphiidae
Palearctic spiders
Spiders of Asia